A cel is a transparent sheet on which objects are drawn or painted for animation purposes.

Cel may refer to:
 Cel (goddess), Etruscan goddess of the earth
 Cel Spellman (born 1995), English actor and presenter
 Aaron Cel (born 1987), French-Polish basketball player
 Cel Publishing, an imprint of VDM Publishing devoted to the reproduction of Wikipedia content
 cel, the ISO-639 code for Celtic languages

CEL may stand for:
 Carboxyl ester lipase or bile salt dependent lipase, an enzyme used in digestion
 Check engine light, a malfunction indicator lamp
 Chemin de Fer de l'Etat Libanais, the national railway network of the Lebanon
 China Energy Label
 Central Electronics Limited, India
 Communications and Entertainment Limited, a defunct Australian home video company
 RTÉ CEL, the commercial arm of Ireland's public service broadcaster RTÉ
 Comunidade do Escutismo Lusófono, the international community for scouting in Lusophone countries
 Chronic eosinophilic leukemia, an extremely rare cancer of the white blood cells
 Celsius Network, CEL token cryptocurrency

See also
 Cell (disambiguation)
 Cels (disambiguation)